Jonathan Sirois (born 27 June 2001) is a Canadian soccer player who plays as a goalkeeper for CF Montréal of Major League Soccer.

Early life
Born in LaSalle, Quebec, Sirois grew up in Saint-Hubert, Quebec, where he played youth soccer with CS St-Hubert before moving to the Montreal Impact Academy in 2015, where he played for the U15, U17, and U19 teams. He was invited to the Generation Adidas International Elite Soccer Program in 2018.

Club career

CF Montréal
After his time in the academy, he signed a first team contract with the Montreal Impact to serve as the team's third goalkeeper on 6 March 2020. He became the 18th academy player to sign a Homegrown Player Contract with the club.

On 22 July 2020, Sirois joined the Vancouver Whitecaps FC on a one-day emergency loan, to serve as the team's backup goalkeeper against Chicago Fire FC during the MLS is Back Tournament. Vancouver was left with only third string goalkeeper Thomas Hasal available after the team's other two goalkeepers, Maxime Crepeau and Bryan Meredith, were unavailable due to injury and a family situation, respectively. The team was also not able to add the league's pool goalkeepers to the roster because the transfer window was closed, due to pool goalkeeper Charlie Lyon's International Transfer Certificate being in the US, while the Whitecaps were a Canadian team, while the other pool, Caleb Patterson-Sewell, whose ITC was in Canada, had already left the bio-secure bubble that the tournament was being hosted in (which is also the reason they could not add an outside keeper). Sirois was able to be added to the roster, due to the Impact being a Canadian team as well, which meant his ITC was already in Canada, as well as already being in the bubble. Upon completion of the 2021 MLS season, CF Montréal would announce that they would exercise the option on Sirois' contract for 2022.

In 2021, he was sent on loan to Valour FC of the Canadian Premier League to gain match experience. He made his debut for Valour on June 27 against Forge FC, recording a clean sheet in a 2–0 victory. He began the season with six consecutive clean sheets, setting a league record. On August 17, he was recalled from his loan by Montreal on an emergency basis, and on August 23, he returned to Valour. At the conclusion of the season, Sirois was named the 2021 CPL Goalkeeper of the year. After attending Montreal's pre-season training camp ahead of the 2022 season, he was once again sent to Valour on a new loan deal.

On February 25, 2023, Sirois made his competitive debut for Montreal, entering as an injury replacement for James Pantemis.

Notes

References

External links
CF Montréal profile

2001 births
Living people
Canadian soccer players
Association football defenders
People from LaSalle, Quebec
Soccer players from Montreal
Sportspeople from Longueuil
CF Montréal players
Vancouver Whitecaps FC players
Valour FC players
Canadian Premier League players
CS St-Hubert players
Major League Soccer players